Klein Sankt Paul is a town in the district of Sankt Veit an der Glan in the Austrian state of Carinthia.

Geography
Klein Sankt Paul lies in the central Görtschitz valley about 36 km northeast of Klagenfurt.

Communities:
Buch, Drattrum, Dullberg, Filfing, Grünburg, Katschniggraben, Kirchberg, Kitschdorf, Klein St. Paul, Maria Hilf, Mösel, Müllergraben, Oberwietingberg, Prailing, Prailing, Raffelsdorf, Sittenberg, Unterwietingberg, Wietersdorf, Wietersdorf, Wieting

References

External links 

 www.klein-st-paul.at - city website

Cities and towns in Sankt Veit an der Glan District